WORA (760 AM, "Noti Uno Oeste") is a radio station licensed to serve Mayagüez, Puerto Rico.  The station is owned by the Uno Radio Group and licensed to the Arso Radio Corporation. It airs a News/Talk format. The station is shared with translator station W260DR 99.9 FM also located in Mayagüez.

The station was assigned the WORA call letters by the Federal Communications Commission in 1947.

Translator stations

References

External links
WORA official website
Uno Radio Group

 

ORA (AM)\
Radio stations established in 1947
1947 establishments in Puerto Rico
ORA (AM)